The molecular formula C25H36O4 (molar mass: 400.55 g/mol, exact mass: 400.2614 u) may refer to:

 Ajulemic acid
 HU-320, or 7-nor-7-carboxy-CBD-1,1-DMH
 Testosterone acetate butyrate
 Testosterone dipropionate